Military star ranking is military terminology, used in mainly English speaking countries, to describe general and flag officers. Within NATO's armed forces, the stars are equal to OF-6–10.

Star ranking

One-star 
A one-star rank is usually the lowest ranking general or flag officer. In many Commonwealth countries, the one-star army rank of Brigadier is considered the highest field officer rank.

Two-star 
A two-star rank is usually the second lowest ranking general or flag officer.

Three-star 
A three-star rank is usually the third highest general or flag officer.

Four-star 
A four-star rank is usually the second highest ranking general or flag officer.

Five-star 

A five-star rank is usually the highest ranking general or flag officer. This rank is usually a field marshal, general of the army, admiral of the fleet or marshal of the air force.

Proposed six-star 

In the United States Armed Forces, a six-star rank is a proposed rank immediately superior to a five-star rank, possibly to be worn by the General of the Armies or Admiral of the Navy; however, this correlation was never officially recognized by the military or by Congress.

List of countries

See also 
 Star (classification)
 Highest military ranks
 Ranks and insignia of NATO

Notes

References 

Military ranks